Las Tunas may refer to:

Argentina:
 Las Tunas, Buenos Aires,  near the Nordelta district
 Las Tunas, Entre Ríos, a locality in Entre Ríos Province 
 Las Tunas, Santa Fe, a locality in Santa Fe Province 

Cuba:
 Las Tunas (city) (originally named Victoria de Las Tunas)
 FC Las Tunas, a soccer club based in Las Tunas
 Leñadores de Las Tunas, baseball team in the Cuban National Series
 Las Tunas Province

United States:
 Las Tunas, California, former settlement in Los Angeles County

See also
Tuna (disambiguation)